George Carmichael (birth unknown – death unknown) was an English professional rugby league footballer who played in the 1920s, 1930s and 1940s. He played at representative level for Yorkshire, and at club level for Hull Kingston Rovers, Bradford Northern and Hull F.C. (World War II guest), as a goal-kicking , i.e. number 1.

Playing career

Challenge Cup Final appearances
George Carmichael played in Bradford Northern's 8–4 victory over Leeds in the 1946–47 Challenge Cup Final during the 1946–47 season at Wembley Stadium, London on Saturday 3 May 1947.

County Cup Final appearances
George Carmichael played, and scored 3-goals in Bradford Northern's 15–5 victory over Dewsbury in the 1940–41 Yorkshire County Cup Final during the 1940–41 season at Fartown Ground, Huddersfield on Saturday 5 April 1941, played and scored 1-goal in the 24–0 victory over Halifax in the 1941–42 Yorkshire County Cup Final during the 1941–42 season at Fartown Ground, Huddersfield on Saturday 6 December 1941, played and scored 1-goal in the 5–2 victory over Wakefield Trinity in the 1945–46 Yorkshire County Cup Final during the 1945–46 season at Thrum Hall, Halifax on Saturday 3 November 1945, and played in the 18–9 victory over Castleford in the 1948–49 Yorkshire County Cup Final during the 1948–49 season at Headingley Rugby Stadium, Leeds on Saturday 30 October 1948.

Club career
George Carmichael was transferred from Hull Kingston Rovers to Bradford Northern on 11 December 1934, with 473 appearances, George Carmichael is second in Bradford Northern/Bradford Bulls all-time appearance list, Keith Mumby heads the list with 588 appearances.

Personal life
George Carmichael was the son of the rugby league footballer; Alf Carmichael.

References

External links
Search for "Carmichael" at rugbyleagueproject.org
(archived by web.archive.org) Stats → Past Players → C at hullfc.com (statistics for player surnames beginning with 'C' and 'D' swapped)
(archived by web.archive.org) Statistics at hullfc.com
History of Bradford Rugby League Club
"George Carmichael" at rlhp.co.uk
"George Carmichael" at rlhp.co.uk
"Team to visit Barrow in the Cup 1946" at rlhp.co.uk
"Challenge cup winning side." at rlhp.co.uk
"The 1947 Team" at rlhp.co.uk
"Ernest Ward holds the Cup aloft" at rlhp.co.uk
(archived by web.archive.org) Bradford win Yorkshire Cup

Bradford Bulls players
English rugby league players
Hull F.C. players
Hull Kingston Rovers players
Place of birth missing
Rugby league fullbacks
Year of birth missing
Year of death missing
Yorkshire rugby league team players